Tyler Daniel Harper (born August 28, 1989) is a Canadian track and field athlete competing in the 400 metres. He came in third in the 2012 Canadian National Championships in Calgary, earning an Olympic "B" standard. He finished 7th at the 2008 IAAF World Junior Championships in Bydgoszcz, Poland. His personal best time is 45.60 seconds, achieved May 5, 2012 in Lubbock, Texas.

References

External links 

1989 births
Living people
Canadian male sprinters
Athletes (track and field) at the 2015 Pan American Games
Pan American Games track and field athletes for Canada
Universiade medalists in athletics (track and field)
Athletes from Mississauga
Universiade bronze medalists for Canada
Medalists at the 2009 Summer Universiade